The Taraba River is a river in Taraba State, Nigeria, a tributary of the Benue River. It joins the Benue on a floodplain 10 km wide and 50 km across.

The major towns along the River Taraba are Sert-Baruwa, Sarki Ruwa, Karamti, Jamtari, Gangumi, Gayam and Bali LGA. The major economic activities on the river are fishing, farming of rice, yam, groundnut.

The major ethnic groups inhabiting the river are the Jibu and the Chamba.

References 

Benue River